Withershins is the follow-up LP to Smoosh's 2006 release of Free To Stay. The album was released on June 29, 2010. It was not released on any official record label, but independently via internet distribution site bandcamp.com and is available for free download.
It is also available on iTunes with its original title, The World's Not Bad. The album was first released in 2008, and again in 2010 as (Smoosh reissue), with the omission of the song "He Will Always Come Back".

Track listing

References

2010 albums
Smoosh albums
Self-released albums
Albums free for download by copyright owner
2008 albums